Rambir Por is a village in Leh district of Ladakh in India. It is located in the Leh tehsil.

Demographics 
According to the 2011 census of India, Rambir Por has 122 households. The effective literacy rate (i.e. the literacy rate of population excluding children aged 6 and below) is 80.78%.

References 

Villages in Leh tehsil